Serafima Andreyevna Gromova (14 June 1923 - 16 September 2013) was a Soviet-Russian electrical engineer. She was awarded the Order of Lenin.

Gromova was born in Orlovka. She joined Osoaviakhim. She was assigned to the 7th Air Defense Division. She served at the Battle of Kursk. She studied at Saratov State University.  She was a specialist in the electronic systems of air defense and missile defense systems.  

In 1966, she became production manager at Factory No. 26 in Fryazino. In 1971, Gromova became head of final assembly at the Mikron microelectronics plant in Zelenograd. She helped develop the control systems for the Buran. She died in Zelenograd on 16 September 2013.

References 

1923 births
2013 deaths
Soviet women engineers
Recipients of the Order of Lenin
People from Talovsky District
People from Bobrovsky Uyezd
Heroes of Socialist Labour
Recipients of the Order of the Red Banner of Labour
Saratov State University alumni
Soviet military personnel of World War II